Zagorska Sela is a village and municipality in  Krapina-Zagorje County in Croatia. According to the 2021 census, there are 897 inhabitants in the area, absolute majority of which are Croats.

Populated places in Krapina-Zagorje County
Municipalities of Croatia